Donald Michie  (11 November 1923 – 7 July 2007) was a British researcher in artificial intelligence. During World War II, Michie worked for the Government Code and Cypher School at Bletchley Park, contributing to the effort to solve "Tunny", a German teleprinter cipher.

Early life and education
Michie was born in Rangoon, Burma. He attended Rugby School and won a scholarship to study classics at Balliol College, Oxford. In early 1943, however, looking for some way to contribute to the war effort, Michie instead attempted to enrol on a Japanese language course in Bedford for intelligence officers. On arrival, it transpired that he had been misinformed, and instead he trained in cryptography, displaying a natural aptitude for the subject. Six weeks later, he was recruited to Bletchley Park and was assigned to the "Testery", a section which tackled a German teleprinter cipher. During his time at Bletchley Park he worked with Alan Turing, Max Newman and Jack Good. Michie and Good were on the initial staff of the Newmanry.

Fom 1945 to 1952 he studied at Balliol College, Oxford. He received his Doctor of Philosophy (D Phil) degree for research in mammalian genetics, in 1953.

Career and research
In 1960, he developed the Matchbox Educable Noughts And Crosses Engine (MENACE), one of the first programs capable of learning to play a perfect game of noughts and crosses. Since computers were not readily available at this time, Michie implemented his program with about 304 matchboxes, each representing a unique board state. Each matchbox was filled with coloured beads, each representing a different move in that board state. The quantity of a colour indicated the "certainty" that playing the corresponding move would lead to a win. The program was trained by playing hundreds of games and updating the quantities of beads in each matchbox depending on the outcome of each game.

Michie was director of the University of Edinburgh's Department of Machine Intelligence and Perception (previously the Experimental Programming Unit) from its establishment in 1965. The machine intelligence unit predated the university's computer science unit. He remained at Edinburgh until 1985, when he left to found The Turing Institute in Glasgow.

Active in the research community into his eighties, he devoted the last decade of his life to the UK charity The Human Computer Learning Foundation, and worked with Stephen Muggleton, Claude Sammut, Richard Wheeler, and others on natural language systems and theories of intelligence. In 2007 he was completing a series of scientific articles on the Sophie Natural Language System and a book manuscript entitled "Jehovah's Creatures". Michie invented the memoisation technique.

He was founder and Treasurer of the Human-Computer Learning Foundation, a charity registered in the UK.

Awards and honours
He was awarded numerous fellowships and honours during his career including:
 Fellow of the Royal Society of Edinburgh (FRSE) (1969)
 Foreign Honorary Member of the American Academy of Arts and Sciences (2001)
 Corresponding Fellow of the Slovenian Academy of Sciences and Arts (2005)
 Fellow of the British Computer Society (FBCS) (1971)

Personal life and death

Michie was married three times, the second to biologist Anne McLaren from 1952 to 1959.  He had four children, one by his first wife, and three by Prof. McLaren, including economist Jonathan Michie and health psychologist Susan Michie.  Michie and McLaren remained friends after their divorce, and became close again after the death of his third wife. On 7 July 2007 Michie and McLaren were killed in a car crash when their car left the M11 motorway, while travelling from Cambridge to London.

Legacy 
The Donald Michie Papers are housed at the British Library. The papers can be accessed through the British Library catalogue.

References

External links

1923 births
2007 deaths
Academics of the University of Edinburgh
Alumni of Balliol College, Oxford
British computer scientists
Fellows of the British Computer Society
Fellows of the Royal Society of Edinburgh
People educated at Rugby School
Bletchley Park people
Road incident deaths in England
Artificial intelligence researchers
Foreign Office personnel of World War II
Michie family